Ptychochromis mainty is a species of cichlid from the subfamily Ptychochrominae, a subfamily which is endemic to the freshwaters of Madagascar. It has only been recorded from forested streams in the vicinity of Fort Dauphin in the south eastern part of the island. Its closest relative is Ptychochromis grandidieri.

References

mainty
Fish described in 2015